Mesir Macunu is a traditional Turkish sweet associated with the city of Manisa. Earlier versions of Mesir macunu were not sweet, but rather spicy in flavor.

Macun is a sweet Turkish confectionery toffee paste that originated from spicy preparations of Mesir macunu.

Herbs and spices used
Below is a list of spices and herbs used in making the Mesir Paste, along with their Turkish and Latin names:

Allspice (Yeni bahar) (Pimenta dioica) 
Alpina officinarum root (Havlıcan kökü) (Alpina officinarium)
Anise (Anason) (Anisum vulgare) 
Black cumin (Çörek otu) (Nigella sativa)
Black Myrobalan (Kara halile) (Terminalia nigra) 
Black pepper (Karabiber) (Piper nigrum) 
Buckthorn (Topalak or Akdiken) (Nerprun alaterne) 
Cardamon (Kakule) (Elettaria cardamomum) 
Cassia (Hiyarsenbe) (Cassia) 
Chebulic myrobalan (Kara halile) (Terminalia chebula) 
China root (Cop-i cini) (Smilax china) 
Cinnamon (Tarçın) (Cinnamomum verum)
Cloves (Karanfil) (Syzygium aromaticum) 
Coconut (Hindistan cevizi) (Cocos nucifera) 
Coriander (Kişniş) (Coriandum sativum)
Cubeb (Kebabe) (Cubebae fructus) 
Cumin (Kimyon) (Cuminum cyminum) 
Dried orange blossom (Portakal çiçeği)
Fennel (Rezene) (Foeniculum vulgare) 
Galingale (Havlıcan) (Alpinia officinarum)
Ginger (Zencefil) (Zingibar officinalis) 
Iksir sugar (Iksir şekeri)
India blossom (Hindistan çiceği)
Java Pepper (Kuyruklu biber) (Piper cubeba) 
Licorice extract (Meyan balı) (Glycyrrhiza uralensis fisch)
Licorice root (Meyan kökü) (Glycyrrhiza glabra)
Mastic (Çam sakızı) (Mastichum)
Millet (Hintdarisi) (Pennisetum glaucum) 
Myrrh (Murrusafi) (Commiphora Molmol) 
Muskroot (Sümbül) (Adoxa moschatellina)
Mustard seed (Hardal tohumu) (Brassica nigra) 
Orange peel (Portakal kabugu) 
Rhubarb (Ravend) (Rheum Palmatum) 
Saffron (Safran) (Crocus Orientalis) 
Citric acid (Limon tuzu) 
Senna (Sinameki) (Cassia senna) 
Turmeric (Zerdeçal) (Curcuma domestica)
Udulkahr (Udulkahir) 
Vanilla (Vanilya) (Vanilla planifolia) 
Woad (Çivit) (Isatis)
Yellow myrobalan (Sarı halile) (Fructus myrobalani)

See also
 List of Turkish desserts

References

Turkish desserts
Turkish inventions
Turkish words and phrases